The Hawk was a cyclecar built in Detroit, Michigan by the Hawk Cyclecar Company in 1914.  The Hawk was belt-driven with a 9/13 hp V-twin engine.  The vehicle was advertised for $390, and could seat two passengers side-by-side.  It had a distinctive sloping bonnet line.

References
 

Defunct motor vehicle manufacturers of the United States
Motor vehicle manufacturers based in Michigan
Cyclecars
Defunct manufacturing companies based in Michigan